Hemse is a locality in Gotland County, Sweden

Hemse may also refer to:
  
 Rebecka Hemse, a Swedish actress
 10124 Hemse, an asteroid